A. amseli may refer to:

 Aethes amseli, a tortrix moth
 Alisa amseli, a small moth
 Autophila amseli, an owlet moth